Kai Owen (born 4 September 1975) is a Welsh actor of stage and screen, known to Welsh audiences for his numerous roles on Welsh language television and to worldwide audiences for his portrayal of Rhys Williams in Torchwood and Pete Buchanan in Hollyoaks.

Background and personal life
Owen was born in the town of Llanrwst in the Conwy Valley in North Wales, where his family still lives. His father Mark is a GMB union official and his mother Yvonne is a cleaner at the British Legion Club. He was educated at Watling Street Primary School, Llanrwst and Ysgol Dyffryn Conwy.
He attended Mountview Theatre School, London for three years, graduating in 1998. Owen lived with his actor fiancée Sarah Wilson in
East Finchley, London and in 2010 moved with son Bobby to Warwickshire.

He ran the 2009 London Marathon for the children's cancer charity CLIC Sargent, and also ran the Virgin London Marathon on 25 April 2010. He is a patron of Llandudno Youth Musical Theatre.

Television career
He became first known as Kev, a gay roofer in Tipyn O Stad, shown on Welsh-language channel S4C. He was a regular in several series (52 episodes) of this popular gritty Welsh television programme; he also appeared in S4C's Treflan as character Bob Lewis. In 2009 he guested as Harri in the second series of Y Pris and as violent loan shark Craig Turner in Pobol Y Cwm (one episode, broadcast 11 September 2009; he appeared in a similar guest role in the show in August and in October 2012).

Owen's first appearance on English-language UK television came in 2001, when he appeared as Buster Edwards in the episode Dog Dago Afternoon of series Fun at the Funeral Parlour. In 2003 he guested in an episode of
BBC One television series Casualty (episode 392, Stuck in the Middle With You, 19 April 2003, as Danny). In 2005 he played the character of Dave 'Shiner' Owen in all six episodes of the series Rocket Man, a BBC One television series about a man trying to launch his dead wife's ashes into space.

2006 saw Owen cast as recurring character Rhys Williams in Torchwood, a spin-off from the science fiction television series Doctor Who, a role for which he has become most renowned. He was elevated to star billing for the third series, broadcast on BBC One in summer 2009, reflecting his growing role in the series. He reprised his role in the fourth series of Torchwood - Torchwood: Miracle Day, broadcast during summer 2011.

Owen appeared in an episode of Celebrity Ready Steady Cook with Torchwood co-star Tom Price (Andy) (recorded 26 August 2009, broadcast 8 January 2010).

In 2011, Owen appeared in the first episode of the third series of Being Human as Bob, leader of a dogging pack. He appears in the 14th episode of the seventh series of long running BBC school drama Waterloo Road as former rugby pro Ken Watling. He appeared in an episode of the 2012 Kay Mellor drama The Syndicate, broadcast on BBC One.

In 2015, Owen joined the cast of the Channel 4 soap opera Hollyoaks playing Pete Buchanan, the ex-partner of Reenie McQueen (Zöe Lucker) and a perpetrator of child abuse. In preparation for the role, he liaised with the NSPCC. After portraying the role until a year later, he made a brief return in 2018. He is also set to reprise the role in April 2021.

Filmography

Television

Narration/Radio

Stage

References

External links
 
 
 

Alumni of the Mountview Academy of Theatre Arts
Welsh male television actors
Welsh male radio actors
Welsh male stage actors
Welsh male soap opera actors
1975 births
Living people
People from Conwy County Borough
People educated at Ysgol Dyffryn Conwy
Welsh-speaking actors
20th-century Welsh male actors
21st-century Welsh male actors